Snoqualmie is a city next to Snoqualmie Falls in King County, Washington, United States. Snoqualmie city is home to the Northwest Railway Museum. The population was 10,670 at the 2010 census and an estimated 13,622 in 2019.

Many of the exterior shots for David Lynch's Twin Peaks television series and movie (Fire Walk with Me) were filmed in Snoqualmie and in the neighboring towns of North Bend and Fall City. Movie actress Ella Raines was born on August 6, 1920, in Snoqualmie Falls, a mill town across the Snoqualmie River that is now part of Snoqualmie.

Etymology

The name "Snoqualmie" comes from the name of the indigenous people of the same name. It is an Anglicization of the Lushootseed name sdukʷalbixʷ, which means "people of the moon".

History

The second written record of the exploration of the Snoqualmie Valley comes from the notes of Samuel Hancock, who ventured up-river with the Snoqualmie tribe in 1851 in search of coal. Near the current location of Meadowbrook Bridge, Hancock was told by his guides that the land was known as Hyas Kloshe Illahee, or "good/productive land". Hancock took this useful information back with him to the area now known as Tacoma. The area that is now Snoqualmie had been continuously occupied by members of the Snoqualmie Tribe and their ancestors for at least 13,000 years.

During the 1850s, tensions were very high between the native populations and the new settlers claiming the land as their own. In 1856, in response to these tensions, Fort Alden was built near a Snoqualmie village, in the area that would become Snoqualmie. After the Treaty War ended, Fort Alden was abandoned (along with other forts built around this time).

The most successful early pioneer in the Valley was Jeremiah Borst, who arrived in the spring of 1858 over the Cedar River trail from the eastern side of the mountains. He settled in the area that formerly held Fort Alden, and used his sales of pigs and apples in Seattle to buy out much of the surrounding land from other settlers.

As successful as farming was, other settlers had different methods of working the land. The very first lumber mill in the Snoqualmie Valley was established at the mouth of Tokul Creek around 1872 by Watson Allen. Within five years, there were 12 logging operations on the Snoqualmie River, providing lumber to the entire Seattle region. Within 15 years, logging and mill work was employing 140 men and sending millions of board feet of logs down the river.

In 1882, the Hop Growers Association was founded by three Puget Sound partners, who used land purchased on Snoqualmie Prairie from Jeremiah Borst to create a farm that would eventually cover ,  of which was devoted solely to hops. This extremely successful venture (billed as "The Largest Hop Ranch in the World") would fall prey to a combination of market and pest factors, and fell into relative obscurity by the end of the 1890s.

By the late 19th century, the Puget Sound region was growing, but bypassed by the major railways. In response, a group of Seattle entrepreneurs funded and built their own railway in an attempt to cross the Cascade Range. The Seattle, Lake Shore and Eastern Railway opened up the natural resources of the Snoqualmie Valley to the markets of the world, and brought in tourists to enjoy the natural beauty of the area and to marvel at the Falls.

The increased interest in the area led to a marked increase in speculation. Originally, the area that would become North Bend was platted as "Snoqualmie Prairie" in February 1889 by Will Taylor. The area that is currently Snoqualmie was platted in August of that same year as "Snoqualmie Falls" by investors from Seattle. The oral history of the area places the first residents of Snoqualmie as Edmund and Louisa Kinsey, who established the first hotel, livery, general store, dance hall, post office, and meat market – in addition to helping build the very first church in the town. Two of their sons (out of six children) are most famous for their photography documenting the early timber works in the region.

The Snoqualmie Falls Hydroelectric Plant, the first power plant at the Falls, was built in the late 1890s by Charles Baker, an investor from Seattle who had assisted in the platting of the city. This development provided both power and jobs to the region, and a small company town grew up near the falls to house the workers. More than 100 years later, Baker's original generators are still in use by Puget Sound Energy.

The official vote for incorporation of "Snoqualmie Falls" as the city of Snoqualmie occurred in 1903. At the time, land prices had not decreased since initially set in 1889 — prices that did not reflect the financial reality of the region. In response to these high prices, people had created a large "squatting" community, building where they wanted regardless of land ownership or interests. The first challenge that the city council faced was lowering lot prices and migrating these buildings off the public right-of way, establishing the basic layout of the town that exists to this day.

In 1917, a new all-electric lumber mill (the second in the U.S.) opened across the river from Snoqualmie, along with the company town associated with it, Snoqualmie Falls. For the first half of the century, the timber industry provided the city and valley with a stable source of income and employment, even as World War I drew away workers and the Great Depression took its toll across the nation.

This prosperity was moderated during the Depression, and with the changes in culture and mobility in the latter half of the century, Snoqualmie and the majority of the valley stagnated. The city was bypassed when US-10 was built across the Cascades (now Interstate 90), and this led to a shift in commerce to the east (into North Bend) and west (into the Bellevue/Issaquah areas).

By the 1960s, the homes that had made up the company town of Snoqualmie Falls had been moved to other locations within the valley, and the city's population had stabilized to a growth rate of roughly 11 people per year over the next 30 years (from 1,216 in 1960 to 1,546 in 1990).

This slow growth cycle continued until the mid-1990s, when the city annexed  of undeveloped land that became the site of the current "master-planned" community of Snoqualmie Ridge, now referred to as Snoqualmie Ridge I. Snoqualmie Ridge I includes 2,250 dwelling units, a business park, a neighborhood center retail area and The Club at Snoqualmie Ridge, a private, PGA Tour-sanctioned golf course. Snoqualmie Ridge II, annexed in 2004, will contain an additional 1,850 dwelling units, a hospital and a limited amount of additional retail. Snoqualmie Ridge I is completely built-out except for several remaining parcels in the business park. Snoqualmie Ridge II is anticipated to be built-out in 2016–2018.  The city council has attempted to balance the desire to retain the rural and historical feel of Snoqualmie with the needs of a significantly larger population than has existed in the valley in the past. The city's historic downtown is undergoing a major renovation to improve its infrastructure and make the area more attractive to visitors to the valley's many natural attractions.

In 2012, the city of Snoqualmie annexed  of the former Weyerhaeuser mill site and mill pond (Borst Lake). The former mill office now hosts Dirtfish, an advanced rally car driver training school. The site is one of the largest undeveloped industrial zoned sites in King County, although significant planning and environmental review for potential future uses remains to be done. The facility hosted a round of the 2014 Global RallyCross Championship.

Geography

Surrounding cities and communities

Climate
Snoqualmie has a cool summer Mediterranean climate (Köppen Csb).

Economy
Until recently, logging and Weyerhaeuser's milling operations were the mainstays of the local economy. Since 1989, the company has run a much smaller mill operation, and ceased all operations at the Weyerhaeuser Mill Site in 2003. While dairies were a significant local industry into the early 1950s, agriculture is no longer a major economic force in the community. With the completion of Interstate 90 in the 1970s, Snoqualmie became more accessible to Seattle and the Eastside region, resulting in more residents working in the communities to the west. In addition, the Snoqualmie Ridge Business Park now employs close to a thousand people, and continues to expand. Major employers in the business park include Space Labs, Motion Water Sports, Technical Glass, T-Mobile, Zetec, and the King County Department of Permitting and Environmental Review.

Currently, the city's scenic and recreational attractions are fostering the growth of a significant local tourism industry. Along with the Falls, the city is home to the Salish Lodge and the Northwest Railway Museum. The Salish Lodge sits atop Snoqualmie Falls adjacent to Puget Sound Energy's Snoqualmie Fall Park. The museum owns a historic depot and operates a historic tourist railway in the city.

Demographics

2013 study
In April 2013, the city of Snoqualmie retained the Economic Development Council of Seattle and King County (EDC) to conduct research and make recommendations that would guide and support a marketing effort aimed at increasing occupancy in the Snoqualmie Ridge Business Park. The city was also interested in recommendations for the use of the Snoqualmie Mill site, and in an estimate of the potential for additional land absorption at Snoqualmie Ridge. EDC issued its final report in September 2013, with updated demographic information about Snoqualmie. The highlights are summarized here.

The average household income in this area is estimated to be $135,386 for the current year (2013), while the average household income is estimated to be $90,874 for King County, $108,160 for Bellevue, $111,460 for Issaquah, $74,847 for Washington, and $70,968 for the United States, for the same time frame. The average household income in this area is projected to increase 5.6% over the next five years, from $135,386 to $142,906. The United States is projected to have a 4.8% increase in average household income.

Education levels are also high. Currently, it is estimated that 9.0% of the population age 25 and over in this area had earned a Master's, Professional, or Doctorate Degree and 24.3% had earned a bachelor's degree. In comparison, for the United States, it is estimated that for the population over age 25, 8.9% had earned a Master's, Professional, or Doctorate Degree, while 15.5% had earned a bachelor's degree.

The age distribution of the population shows that approximately 35% of the residents are children (age 0–19), 51% are age 20–54, and 14% are 55 and older. Thus the community is primarily a home for working families. Average household size is approximately 3.07; a "typical" household is two adults and one child. The current year median age for this population is 34.2, while the average age is 31.2. Five years from now, the median age is projected to be 35.1. The current year median age for the United States is 36.5, while the average age is 37.7. Five years from now, the median age is projected to be 37.2.

2010 census
As of the census of 2010, there were 10,670 people, 3,547 households, and 2,912 families residing in the city. The racial makeup of the city was 83.3% White, 0.8% African American, 0.9% Native American, 9.3% Asian, 0.1% Pacific Islander, 1.4% from other races, and 4.4% from two or more races. Hispanic or Latino of any race were 5.3% of the population.

There were 3,547 households, of which 55.4% had children under the age of 18 living with them, 71.3% were married couples living together, 7.7% had a female householder with no husband present, 3.1% had a male householder with no wife present, and 17.9% were non-families. 13.1% of all households were made up of individuals, and 1.7% had someone living alone who was 65 years of age or older. The average household size was 3.01 and the average family size was 3.33.

The median age in the city was 33.7 years. 35% of residents were under the age of 18; 3.1% were between the ages of 18 and 24; 38.9% were from 25 to 44; 19.2% were from 45 to 64; and 3.9% were 65 years of age or older. The gender makeup of the city was 50.0% male and 50.0% female.

2000 census
As of the 2000 census, there were 1,631 people, 632 households, and 432 families residing in the city.  The population density was 317.2 people per square mile (122.5/km2).  There were 656 housing units at an average density of 127.6 per square mile (49.3/km2).  The racial makeup of the city was 89.88% White, 0.86% African American, 2.58% Native American, 1.90% Asian, 0.06% Pacific Islander, 1.78% from other races, and 2.94% from two or more races. Hispanic or Latino of any race were 5.21% of the population.

There were 632 households, out of which 38.8% had children under the age of 18 living with them, 48.4% were married couples living together, 14.1% had a female householder with no husband present, and 31.6% were non-families. 25.2% of all households were made up of individuals, and 4.7% had someone living alone who was 65 years of age or older. The average household size was 2.58 and the average family size was 3.06.

In the city the population was spread out, with 28.9% under the age of 18, 7.9% from 18 to 24, 39.3% from 25 to 44, 17.7% from 45 to 64, and 6.2% who were 65 years of age or older. The median age was 32 years. For every 100 females, there were 101.1 males. For every 100 females age 18 and over, there were 99.8 males.

The median income for a household in the city was US$52,697, and the median income for a family was US$58,889. Males had a median income of US$40,645 versus US$30,917 for females. The per capita income for the city was US$22,239. About 6.1% of families and 9.4% of the population were below the poverty line, including 16.9% of those under age 18 and 1.7% of those age 65 or over.

Government and police

On March 8, 2014, the Snoqualmie Police Department began providing law enforcement services to the neighboring city of North Bend. From 1973 until 2014 North Bend received law enforcement services from the King County Sheriff's Office.

City landmarks
The city of Snoqualmie has designated the following landmark:

Sister cities
Snoqualmie has the following sister cities:

 Gangjin, South Korea
 Chaclacayo, Peru

References

External links

 
 Snoqualmie Ridge neighborhood
 Live North Bend Weather
 Factual Information from www.city-data.com
 Hiking in the Snoqualmie area
 InTwinPeaks.com –Photos of the Twin Peaks filming locations in Snoqualmie, then and now 
 

Cities in King County, Washington
Cities in the Seattle metropolitan area
Cities in Washington (state)
Washington placenames of Native American origin